Celine Dion Parfums is a brand line of celebrity-endorsed perfumes by Canadian singer Celine Dion and Coty, Inc., with global retail sales of more than $850 million by March 2010. As of 2011, there have been 14 (only 9 of which has been released in the United States) perfumes that have been released. A new fragrance called Signature, was released in September 2011.

Background
In 2003, Coty, Inc. created a partnership to release a range of perfumes, each representing a period in Dion's career with different styles and notes. The first fragrance was named after the singer and was released in 2003 to great success. The notes of the perfume are a blend of light, luscious florals including water lily, orange blossom and an exotic Tiare flower, balanced with warm, rich amber, sheer musk and pristine blonde woods.

Fragrances

Celine Dion

The first fragrance was released on 25 March 2003 the same day as she launched her record-breaking A New Day... Vegas show and her album One Heart and was a big success. It consists of red cherries, violets, Lily of the Valley, yellow roses, tiare, orange blossoms, jasmine, blonde woods, sandalwood, amber, and musk. The fragrance won the award for Women's Fragrance of the Year - Popular Appeal at the annual FiFi Awards in 2004. It was also nominated for the 'Women's Scent' category at the 2004 Cosmetic Executive Women Beauty Awards and won 3 other awards in 2004 according to her official website.

The fragrance was launched in JC Penney's and became the Number 1 fragrance launch in their history and the Number 1 fragrance launch in chain department stores in 2003, as well as the number 1 fragrance launch in broad distribution in 2003. Over 3 millions units of Celine Dion Parfums were sold in between 2003 & 2004.

Notes
The second fragrance was released on 6 April 2004. Top notes are mimosa, nectarine, gardenia and water lily; middle notes are peony, heliotrope and orchid; base notes are Australian sandalwood, guaiac wood, vetiver and white musk.

Belong
The third fragrance was released on 13 March 2005. Belong was another good seller and won a FiFi Award in 2006 for Best Female packaging and was nominated for Fragrance of the Year.

Always Belong
The fourth fragrance released on 9 January 2006. Always belong was nominated at the 2007 FiFi Awards for the Women's Popular Appeal award.

Memento
A fifth fragrance released as a Special Edition exclusively for Celines own website, released 28 November 2005.

Enchanting
The sixth fragrance released on 16 September 2006 to selected European countries and then released the United States in January 2007. The notes consisted of osmanthus, ripe red berries and cyclamen, notes of orchid, gardenia and fresh freesia as well as notes of amber, sandalwood and tonka beans.

Reviews were excellent, with Fashion Magazine calling it a "Showstopper". On 8 June 2007, it won a special award from the French Fragrance industry for the Best Female Fragrance Launch in Mass Distribution in 2006. The fragrance was also nominated at the 2008 Fifi Awards for Women's Popular Appeal.

Spring in Paris
The seventh fragrance released on 13 May 2007. Released as an Avon only fragrance and features notes of redcurrant, blackcurrant, mandarin, lilac, osmanthus, lily of the valley, jasmine, musk, vanilla and soft woods. The perfume was created by Richard Herpin.

Paris Nights
The eighth fragrance released in August 2007, is a follow up of Spring in Paris and was very well received. The new scent, developed by perfumer Karine Dubreuil, is meant to evoke the glamour and excitement of evenings in Paris. The notes include wisteria, passion fruit, black violet, wild jasmine, broom, osmanthus, rose, vanilla, amber, cashmere, sandalwood and patchouli.

Sensational
The ninth fragrance was released initially exclusive to TeamCeline members on her official fansite on 23 February 2008 and worldwide later in the year. The notes of this fragrance are with a floral scent with sparkling icy pear, luscious plum and crisp, juicy apple, and evolves into a dynamic medley of mimosa, jasmine, freesia and orris as well as rich amber and warm musk. The fragrance won a shape of beauty award 2008 and was also nominated at the 2009 Fifi Awards for Women's Popular Appeal. The fragrance also came with a

Sensational Moments
The tenth fragrance released on 28 February 2009. Very well received due to its notes, with top notes of mandarin orange, blackberry and juicy pink grapefruit; middle notes are freesia, ginger and pink peony; base notes are hazelnut, musk and white amber.

Chic
The eleventh fragrance released in May 2009. Notes of green aquatic notes and water melon in top notes. A heart encompasses floral waves of peony, gardenia, lotus and green violets. A base hides woody accords of sandalwood, blond wood, amber and musk.

Spring in Provence
The twelfth fragrance released in September 2009 is inspired by the region of Provence and the notes of floral fusion of honeysuckle, mimosa absolute, fig blossom and violet, while a base incorporates ambrette accords, earthy aura of vetiver wrapped in musk. According to Celines official website, this fragrance is a Rare and strictly limited edition.

Simply Chic
The thirteenth fragrance released in March 2010 to excellent reviews. The notes are a citrus Sicilian bergamot, black currant, and tangerine juice. Its heart captures floral bouquet of freesia and white roses. The final notes of musk, white amber, patchouli, and sandalwood make the perfume incredibly harmonious and sensual.

Simply Chic saw the release of a Mini Site all about the fragrance with full press release for some of the countries, Q&A with the creators and information of the Ingredients.

Pure Brilliance
The fourteenth fragrance (8th US Fragrance), was released on 11 September 2010. Ahead of its release Dion herself said, "Pure Brilliance is about the radiance and beauty at the heart of every woman. It's the energy within that makes every woman unique." Quoted in the same article was Senior Vice President of Global Marketing for Coty Steve Mormoris said, "Celine is one of the biggest female singers in history, and the attachment her fans have to her and to her fragrances is astounding. Every fragrance we launch with her does well." Pure Brilliance consists of granny smith apples, pear, green leaves, freesia, honeysuckle, lily, muguet, musk, peach skin, and blonde wood.

During an interview with InStyle Celine, said of the new fragrance "I’m enjoying my time off with my family, so I’ve made this a very delicate one about inner beauty."

Signature
The fifteenth fragrance was released in September 2011 and was described as a way for Celine "to reach my fans in a completely different, yet very personal way." This fragrance gives ode to Celine's ability to inspire and connect with people through her music, and to capture that this fragrance is an elegant, classic scent with modern appeal by Firmenich perfumer Ilias Ermenidis. This perfume has mimosa, pinklady apple, guava, rose essence, jasmine, magnolia, sensual musk, amberwood, and sandalwood.

Sensational - Luxe Blossom
The sixteenth fragrance was released in selected markets in 2013.

All For Love
For her seventeenth fragrance "All For Love", a leaked photo of the box appeared online in March 2014. This perfume was released in selected countries in April 2014.

Achievements
 Celine Dion Parfums ranked number 3 among the best selling celebrity fragrances in 2008 in the United States. According to a study conducted by Euromonitor International with sales of $26.4 million.
 On announcement of the release of Pure Brilliance it was announced that global retails sales are currently at $850 Million, ranking as one of the most successful celebrity fragrances.

Awards

References

External links
Official website
Simply Chic Mini Site

Celebrity perfumes
Perfumes released by Coty, Inc.